Robert Crowley may refer to:

*Robert Crowley (printer) (c. 1517–1588), English Protestant printer, editor, chronicler, social critic, poet, polemicist, and clergyman
Robert Crowley (CIA) (1924–2000), Assistant Deputy Director of Clandestine Operations of the CIA
Bob Crowley (born 1952), theatre director
Bob Crowley (Survivor contestant) (born 1951), winner of Survivor: Gabon
Bob D. Crowley, software executive, investor
R. T. Crowley (born 1948), pioneer in electronic commerce
Robert Crowley (bobsleigh) (born 1942), American bobsledder